In mathematics, the interior product (also known as interior derivative, interior multiplication, inner multiplication, inner derivative, insertion operator, or inner derivation) is a degree −1 (anti)derivation on the exterior algebra of differential forms on a smooth manifold. The interior product, named in opposition to the exterior product, should not be confused with an inner product. The interior product  is sometimes written as

Definition

The interior product is defined to be the contraction of a differential form with a vector field.  Thus if  is a vector field on the manifold  then 

is the map which sends a -form  to the -form  defined by the property that

for any vector fields 

The interior product is the unique antiderivation of degree −1 on the exterior algebra such that on one-forms 

The above relation says that the interior product obeys a graded Leibniz rule. An operation satisfying linearity and a Leibniz rule is called a derivation.

Properties

If in local coordinates  the vector field  is described by functions , then the interior product is given by

By antisymmetry of forms, 

and so  This may be compared to the exterior derivative  which has the property  

The interior product relates the exterior derivative and Lie derivative of differential forms by the Cartan formula (also known as the Cartan identity, Cartan homotopy formula or Cartan magic formula):

This identity defines a duality between the exterior and interior derivatives. Cartan's identity is important in symplectic geometry and general relativity: see moment map. The Cartan homotopy formula is named after Élie Cartan. 

The interior product with respect to the commutator of two vector fields   satisfies the identity

See also

Notes

References

 Theodore Frankel, The Geometry of Physics: An Introduction; Cambridge University Press, 3rd ed. 2011
 Loring W. Tu, An Introduction to Manifolds, 2e, Springer. 2011. 

Differential forms
Differential geometry
Multilinear algebra